Huse is a surname. Notable people with the surname include:
Brad Huse, American basketball coach
Caleb Huse (1831–1905), Confederate States Army officer
Camilla Huse (born 1979), Norwegian footballer
David A. Huse (born 1958), American theoretical physicist
Harry M. P. Huse (1858–1942), United States Navy admiral
Patrick Huse (born 1948), Norwegian painter
Sibyl Marvin Huse (1866-1939), French-born American author and teacher

See also
USS Huse (DE-145), Edsall-class destroyer escort